UFN is an acronym for:

 UFC Ultimate Fight Night, a mixed martial arts event held by Ultimate Fight Championship company
 Uspekhi Fizicheskikh Nauk, Russian academical publication of Physics
 Ucluelet First Nation, the treaty government of the Yuułuʔiłʔatḥ in the Canadian province of British Columbia
 "United Federation of Nations", an episode of Code Geass: Lelouch of the Rebellion R2
 Union des Femmes du Niger, a women's organisation in Niger active from 1959 to 1974